Jang Seong-won (born 17 June 1997) is a South Korean football midfielder, who plays for Daegu FC in the K League 1.

Club career
Born on 17 June 1997, Jang played his youth football for Hannam University. He transferred to Daegu FC in January 2018, and made his debut for the club on 8 August 2018, playing against Yangpyeong in a Korean FA Cup match. He played his first K League 1 match on 30 September 2018, against the Pohang Steelers.

Club career statistics

Honors and awards

Player
Daegu FC
 Korean FA Cup Winners (1) : 2018

Notes

1997 births
Living people
Association football midfielders
South Korean footballers
Daegu FC players
K League 1 players